Robert Herbert Story (28 January 1835 – 13 January 1907) was a Scottish divine and Principal of the University of Glasgow. He attained the highest position in the Scottish church as Moderator of the General Assembly of the Church of Scotland in 1894.

Biography
Story was born on 28 January 1835 at the manse at Rosneath, Dunbartonshire, the son of Rev Robert Story, the parish minister.

He was educated at the universities of Edinburgh, St Andrews and Heidelberg. In November 1858 he was licensed to preach as a Church of Scotland minister by the Presbytery of Dumbarton. He was then sent to Canada to improve the Church of Scotland's presence there. In 1859, he was assistant minister at St Andrew's Church, Montreal, but in February 1860 returned to Scotland when he was inducted as minister of his home town of Rosneath in succession to his father.

Edinburgh University awarded him a Doctor of Divinity in 1874. He was appointed Junior Clerk of the General Assembly in 1886. From 1885 to 1889 he was Editor of the Scots Magazine.

In November 1886, he moved to Glasgow University as Professor of Church History. In 1898, he became Principal of the University, succeeding John Caird. He was Moderator of the General Assembly of the Church of Scotland in 1894, and its Principal Clerk from that year until his death on 13 January 1907.

Story had been appointed in 1886 as Chaplain in Ordinary to Queen Victoria, and was also Chaplain-in-Ordinary in Scotland to King Edward VII following Victoria's death. Story was appointed Honorary Chaplain to the Clyde Brigade of the Royal Naval Artillery Volunteers in 1896., and to the Royal Naval Volunteer Reserve in 1904.

He received an honorary doctorate as Doctor of Laws (LL.D.) from the University of St Andrews in 1900.

He lived his final years in rooms at the University (13 University) and died in Glasgow on 13 January 1907. His position as Principal was filled by Sir Donald MacAlister.

Family

In October 1863 he married the author Janet Leith Maughan (d. 1926), daughter of Captain Philip Maughan. They had a son, who died in infancy and two daughters.

Trivia

John Anderson, the eighteenth-century pioneer of vocational education and Professor of Natural Philosophy at Glasgow, was also born in Rosneath and the son of the minister of the parish church.

Character
Story was a staunch supporter of the Church of Scotland, and had little sympathy for schemes of reunion with the other Presbyterian communities. He vigorously opposed the action of Bishop Welldon, then metropolitan of Calcutta, in excluding Scottish chaplains and troops from the use of garrison churches in India because these had not received episcopal consecration. He was characterized by an absolutely fearless honesty, which sometimes gave offence, but at the basis of his nature there was a warm, tender and sympathetic heart, incapable of meanness or intrigue.

Works

In addition to lives of his father (1862), Professor Robert Lee (1870) and William Carstares (1876), he published a devotional book Christ the Consoler; a volume of sermons, Creed and Conduct (1878); The Apostolic Ministry in the Scottish Church (Baird Lecture, 1897), and several pamphlets on church questions.

Is magnum opus was The Church of Scotland, Past and Present 5.vols. (1890/1)

References

Attribution

External links
 
 

People from Rosneath
1835 births
1907 deaths
Church of Scotland
Academics of the University of Glasgow
Principals of the University of Glasgow
Alumni of the University of Edinburgh
Alumni of the University of St Andrews
Heidelberg University alumni
Moderators of the General Assembly of the Church of Scotland